Gero von Wilpert (13 March 1933 – 24 December 2009) was a German author, a senior lecturer in German at the University of New South Wales and, from 1980, Professor of German at the University of Sydney.

Life and career
Wilpert was born in Tartu (Dorpat), Estonia. Like all Baltic Germans, he was forced to leave Estonia after the Molotov–Ribbentrop Pact and the takeover of the country by the Soviet Union (1939–40).

From 1953 to 1957 he studied at the University of Heidelberg, where he was at times a docent. He then settled near Stuttgart to work as independent author and lecturer.

Wilpert published several editions of an encyclopedia of literary descriptions Sachwörterbuch der Literatur. He also wrote a comprehensive Lexikon der Weltliteratur [Lexicon of World Literature] and earlier had published his Deutsche Literatur in Bildern [German Literature in Pictures] and a journal on Schiller.

He was a member of the Australian Academy of the Humanities.

Wilpert died in Sydney.

Books
 Sachwörterbuch der Literatur. Kröner, 1955; 8th revised edition, 2001, .
 Lexikon der Weltliteratur. Kröner, 1963; 4th edition, 2004.
 Erstausgaben deutscher Dichtung. Joint author: Adolf Gühring. 1967; 2nd revised edition, 1992, .
 Moderne Weltliteratur. Die Gegenwartsliteraturen Europas und Amerikas. Joint author: Ivar Ivask. Kröner, 1972, .
 Deutsche Literatur in Bildern. Kröner, 1957; 2nd revised edition, 1975.
 Der verlorene Schatten. Kröner, 1978, .
 Deutsches Dichterlexikon. Kröner, 1988, .
 Die deutsche Gespenstergeschichte. Kröner, 1994, .
 Goethe-Lexikon. Kröner, 1998, .
 Schiller-Chronik. Sein Leben und Schaffen. 2000, .
 Deutschbaltische Literaturgeschichte. C.H. Beck, München 2005, .
 Die 101 wichtigsten Fragen: Goethe. C.H. Beck, München 2007, .
 Die 101 wichtigsten Fragen: Schiller. C.H. Beck, München 2009, .

References

External links 
 Gerhard Schulz, Gero von Wilpert (1933–2009), Australian Academy of the Humanities. Retrieved 7 February 2017.

1933 births
2009 deaths
Baltic-German people
People from Tartu
Heidelberg University alumni
Academic staff of the University of Sydney
Estonian non-fiction writers
German male writers
20th-century non-fiction writers
Male non-fiction writers